The Marquise of Armiani is a 1920 German silent film directed by Alfred Halm and starring Pola Negri, Ernst Dernburg, and Elsa Wagner.

The film's sets were designed by the art director Kurt Richter.

Cast
 Pola Negri as Marchesa Assunta
 Ernst Dernburg as Polizeichef
 Elsa Wagner as Assuntas Mutter
 Max Pohl
 Fritz Schulz

References

Bibliography
 Mariusz Kotowski. Pola Negri: Hollywood's First Femme Fatale. University Press of Kentucky, 2014.

External links

1920 films
1920 drama films
German drama films
Films of the Weimar Republic
German silent feature films
Films directed by Alfred Halm
German black-and-white films
UFA GmbH films
Silent drama films
1920s German films